In Irish mythology, Mag Mell (modern spelling: Magh Meall, meaning "delightful plain") is one of the names for the Celtic Otherworld, a mythical realm achievable through death and/or glory. Unlike the underworld in some mythologies, Mag Mell was a pleasurable paradise, identified as either an island far to the west of Ireland or a kingdom beneath the ocean. However, Mag Mell was similar to the fields of Elysium in Greek mythology, and, like the fields of Elysium, was accessible only to a select few. Furthermore, Mag Mell, like the numerous other mystical islands said to be off the coast of Ireland, was never explicitly stated in any surviving mythological account to be an afterlife. Rather, it is usually portrayed as a paradise populated by deities, which is occasionally visited by some adventurous mortals. In its island guise it was visited by various Irish heroes and monks forming the basis of the Adventure Myth or "echtrae" as defined by Myles Dillon in his book Early Irish Literature. This otherworld is a place where sickness and death do not exist.  It is a place of eternal youth and beauty.  Here, music, strength, life and all pleasurable pursuits come together in a single place.  Here happiness lasts forever, no one wants for food or drink.  It is the Irish equivalent of the Greek Elysium or the Valhalla of the Norse.

Legends say its ruler is the Fomorian King Tethra, or more frequently Manannan mac Lir. Mag Mell's allure extended from the pagan era to Christian times. In later stories, the realm is less an afterlife destination than an Earthly Paradise which adventurers could reach by traveling west from Ireland, often blown off course by providential tempests while on an inspired mission. They typically explore many other fantastic islands before reaching their destination and returning home (or sailing on). Among these voyagers are St. Brendan, Bran mac Febal (see The Voyage of Bran), and The Voyage of Máel Dúin.

In popular media 

 The German Metal band SuidAkrA's  album Book of Dowth includes a song titled 'Mag Mell'.
Deep Sea Aquarium Magmell (Japanese:マグメル深海水族館, Hepburn: Magumeru Shinkai Suizokukan) is a manga by Kiyomi Sugishita that references the original legend of Mag Mell as inspiration for the series' main setting.

See also
Tír na nÓg
Fortunate Isles
Valhalla
Avalon 
Vyraj 
Aaru
Heaven
Aericura
Aillen
Sídhe
Brasil

References

Irish mythology
Conceptions of heaven
Locations in Celtic mythology
Mythical utopias
Fictional countries
Mythological islands